Cornelia Maria (Cocky) van Engelsdorp-Gastelaars (born 24 February 1938, Rotterdam) is a Dutch former swimmer who twice improved the world record in the women's 100 metre freestyle in 1956.

On March 3, 1956, in Amsterdam she broke the 20-year-old record of 1:04.6 by Willy den Ouden, who like Gastelaars, was born and raised in Rotterdam. Only later it turned out that her time of 1:04.2 was an improvement on Dawn Fraser race in 1:04.5 in Sydney the previous week. On April 14 Gastelaars lowered the record to 1:04.0 in her home base swimming pool in Schiedam. The decision by the Dutch Olympic Committee to boycott the Olympics in Melbourne that same year in protest of the Soviet invasion of Hungary caused her to miss out on a likely medal in the 100m individual freestyle and the 4 × 100 m relays.

She did compete in the 1960 Summer Olympics, but was past her prime at that point and finished seventh in 100m freestyle.

See also
 World record progression 100 metres freestyle

References

1938 births
Living people
Dutch female freestyle swimmers
World record setters in swimming
Swimmers from Rotterdam
Olympic swimmers of the Netherlands
Swimmers at the 1960 Summer Olympics
European Aquatics Championships medalists in swimming